Schinia snowi is a moth of the family Noctuidae. It is found in North America, including Colorado, Texas, Kansas and Wyoming.

The wingspan is 22–26 mm.

Larvae have been recorded on Allium.

External links
Species info
Images

Schinia
Moths of North America
Moths described in 1875